Yangmei may refer to:

Fruit
 Myrica rubra, or yangmei (杨梅), a Chinese fruit

Places
 Yangmei District (楊梅區), district of Taoyuan City, Taiwan
 Yangmei, Jiangxi (扬眉镇), town in Chongyi County
 Yangmei, Huazhou (杨梅镇), Guangdong
 Yangmei, Yangshan County (杨梅镇), Guangdong
 Yangmei Ancient Town (杨美), Nanning, Guangxi
 Yangmei, Rong County (杨梅镇), Guangxi